Sisir Kumar Ghosh (1840–1911) was a noted Indian journalist, founder of the Amrita Bazar Patrika, a noted Bengali language newspaper in 1868 and a freedom fighter from Bengal.

He started the India League in 1875 with the object of stimulating the sense of nationalism amongst the people. He was also a Vaishnavite, remembered for writings on mystic-saint Lord Chaitanya, and penning a book on him titled Lord Gauranga or Salvation for All in 1897. He also writes several biographies for example: Narottam Charit.
He was one of the first batch of students who passed in the first entrance examination of the Calcutta University in 1857.

References 

19th-century Indian journalists
1911 deaths
1840 births
Bengali Hindus
19th-century Bengalis
20th-century Bengalis
Academic staff of Visva-Bharati University
Indian historians
19th-century historians
20th-century Indian historians
Indian literary historians
Rabindranath Tagore
Indian publishers (people)
ABP Group
University of Calcutta alumni
Bengali writers
Indian biographers
19th-century Indian biographers
Male biographers
Indian independence activists from West Bengal
Journalists from West Bengal
Indian dramatists and playwrights
20th-century Indian dramatists and playwrights
19th-century Indian dramatists and playwrights
Indian male dramatists and playwrights
Dramatists and playwrights from West Bengal
Hare School alumni
Presidency University, Kolkata alumni
Indian editors
Indian newspaper editors
Indian newspaper founders